Hürüuşağı (also, Huruushaghy and Guruushagy) is a village and municipality in the Yevlakh District of Azerbaijan. It has a population of 899. The municipality consists of the villages of Huruushaghy and Boshchaly.

References 

Populated places in Yevlakh District